Antoine Cariot (1820 in Écully – 22 February 1883 in Sainte-Foy-lès-Lyon) was a 19th-century French priest, mostly known as a botanist.

Selected bibliography  

 Étude des fleurs, botanique élémentaire, descriptive et usuelle, par Ludovic Chirat. 2ª ed. entièrement revue par l'abbé Cariot. Ed. Girard & Josserand, 1854 ;
 Notice biographique sur M. l'abbé Chirat de Souzy. Ed. Girard & Josserand, 1857
 Étude des fleurs. Botannique élémentaire, descriptive et usuelle. 3ª ed., entièrement revue et augmentée par l'abbé Cariot. Ed. Girard & Josserand, 1865 ;
 Étude des fleurs. Botannique élémentaire, descriptive et usuelle. 3ª ed., entièrement revue et augmentée par l'abbé Cariot. Ed. Girard & Josserand, 1872 ;
 Catalogue des plantes qui croissent aux environs de Brides-les-Bains, Salins et Moutiers. Ed. Impr. de C. Riotor, 1878 ; 
 Étude des fleurs. Botanique élémentaire, descriptive et usuelle. 6ª ed., renfermant la flore du bassin moyen du Rhône et de la Loire. Ed. P.-N. Josserand, 1879 ;
 Étude des fleurs. Botanique élémentaire, descriptive et usuelle. 6ª ed., renfermant la flore du bassin moyen du Rhône et de la Loire. Ed. Vitte & Perrussel, 1888 ;
 Botanique élémentaire descriptive et usuelle, par l'abbé Cariot et le Dr Saint-Lager,... 8ª ed. Ed. E. Vitte, 1897.

References

External links 
 Antoine Cariot on data.bnf.fr
 CARIOT Antoine
 Antoine Cariot on Wikispecies
 Nos Lyonnais d'hier

1820 births
People from Rhône (department)
1883 deaths
19th-century French botanists
Botanists with author abbreviations